Miloje Petković (born 31 January 1967) is a retired Serbian footballer, who played as a midfielder.

Club career
Petković played football with FK Vojvodina in the Yugoslav First League.

Petković moved to Greece in July 1993, initially joining Greek second division side Veria F.C. He would spend three seasons with the club in the second division before they were promoted to the Greek first division after the 1995–96 season. He would spend two more years with the club playing the top division. In total, Petković made 61 appearances in the Greek top flight.

The 1998-99 season, he signed with Cypriot First division club APOEL, where he helped his team to win the Cypriot Cup. He joined Apollon Athens on a 1.5 year contract at age 33 in December 1999.

Following his retirement, he was shortly hired as a co-coach by Veria in 2007. and by Diagoras F.C. from Rhodes in 2011. where he cooperate with famous Serbian coach Ratko Dostanic

References

External links
Profile at Strukljeva.net

1967 births
Living people
Yugoslav footballers
FK Vojvodina players
Veria F.C. players
Apollon Smyrnis F.C. players
APOEL FC players
Association football midfielders
Serbian expatriate footballers
Expatriate footballers in Greece
Serbian expatriate sportspeople in Greece
Expatriate footballers in Cyprus
Serbian expatriate sportspeople in Cyprus
Cypriot First Division players